Willford Isbell King (June 2, 1880 – October 17, 1962) was an American statistician, economist, and chairman of the Committee for Constitutional Government, Inc.

Biography
King was born in Cascade, Iowa on June 2, 1880.  King received his education from one-room schoolhouse teachers in Nebraska. He attended the University of Nebraska, graduating 1905.  He received his Doctor of Philosophy degree from University of Wisconsin–Madison in 1913.

He went to Washington, D.C. to become a statistician with the United States Public Health Service from 1917–1920. In 1917 he was elected as a Fellow of the American Statistical Association. In 1920, he moved on to become the economist for the National Bureau of Economic Research.  In 1927, King moved on from public service to become an economics professor at New York University.

During the Great Depression, King opposed the New Deal. Instead, he advocated a sliding scale of wages based on production, no government intervention in business, currency expansion, the reduction of taxes in upper brackets, and the abolition of all levies on incomes of corporations and from invested capital.

In 1933, he founded the Committee on Economic Accord.  In 1945, King retired from NYU to become chairman of the Committee for Constitutional Government, Inc., he later would serve as an advisor.

King and his wife Jane Elizabeth Patterson, had three children, Harold J., Hugh Patterson., and Floralie Jane.

KIng's grandson, and his namesake, is Willford S. King of Boise, Idaho.  Willford is the son of Harold J. King.

King died at his home in Douglaston, New York on October 17, 1962.

Works
The Handbook of Accepted Economics
Keys to Prosperity
The Elements of Statistical Method
Income in the United States: Its Amount & Distribution 1909-1919
The Wealth and Income of the People of the United States
various articles on economics

Pamphlets
Are Food Subsidies Necessary? (ca. 1944)
Are The Upper Income Classes Getting an Increasing Share of the National Income? (ca. 1944)

See also
A Program for Monetary Reform (1939)

References

1880 births
1962 deaths
University of Wisconsin–Madison alumni
Presidents of the American Statistical Association
Fellows of the American Statistical Association
American statisticians
People from Cascade, Iowa
Mathematicians from Iowa
20th-century American male writers